Koszewo may refer to the following places:
Koszewo, Greater Poland Voivodeship (west-central Poland)
Koszewo, Podlaskie Voivodeship (north-east Poland)
Koszewo, West Pomeranian Voivodeship (north-west Poland)